Kintoun, is a protein that is encoded by the DNAAF2 gene.

Function 

Kintoun is a highly conserved protein involved in the preassembly of dynein arm complexes which power cilia. These complexes are found in some cilia and are assembled in the cytoplasm prior to transport for ciliogenesis.

Clinical significance 

Mutations in DNAAF2 are associated with primary ciliary dyskinesia.

References

External links
 GeneReviews/NCBI/NIH/UW entry on Primary Ciliary Dyskinesia